Euhadenoecus puteanus, the puteanus camel cricket, is a species of camel cricket in the family Rhaphidophoridae. It is found in North America.

References

Further reading

 
 

Rhaphidophoridae
Insects described in 1877